Holcus annuus, called annual fog, is a species of flowering plant in the grass family Poaceae, native to the Mediterranean region and the Transcaucasus, and introduced to southeastern Australia. In spite of its scientific and common names, it is a perennial.

References

Pooideae
Flora of North Africa
Flora of Portugal
Flora of Spain
Flora of Italy
Flora of Greece
Flora of the East Aegean Islands
Flora of Lebanon
Flora of Syria
Flora of Palestine (region)
Flora of Turkey
Flora of the Transcaucasus
Plants described in 1831